Micracanthicus vandragti is a species of suckermouth catfish endemic to Venezuela where it is found in the Ventuari River and adjacent Orinoco River.  This species grows to a length of  SL. It is the sole species of the genus Micracanthicus.

References
 

Loricariidae
Monotypic fish genera
Fish of Venezuela
Endemic fauna of Venezuela
Fish described in 2011
Taxobox binomials not recognized by IUCN